Sunnyside is an unincorporated community located in the towns of Superior, and Parkland, Douglas County, Wisconsin, United States. Sunnyside was built along the railroad, with the old depot being a house, and the tracks now an ATV trail.

References

Unincorporated communities in Douglas County, Wisconsin
Unincorporated communities in Wisconsin